Karate Kommandos (also known as Chuck Norris: Karate Kommandos) is an American animated television series that originally aired in 1986 as a syndicated five episode mini-series. It was created by and starred Chuck Norris as himself, and produced by Ruby-Spears Enterprises. Re-runs of the cartoon have occasionally aired on Boomerang and Adult Swim.

Plot

This fictionalized version of Chuck Norris is a United States government operative with a team of racially diverse warriors known as the Karate Kommandos. Together, they fight against the organization VULTURE led by the Claw and his right-hand man Super Ninja.

Production
The series follows the framing device of Mister T (also a Ruby-Spears production). At the beginning of each episode, a live action segment with Norris, usually at a gym or a martial arts studio, is shown to explain what is going on. At the end of each episode, Norris narrates a moral lesson for the audience to learn.

Characters

Karate Kommandos
The team includes:
 Chuck Norris (voiced by himself) - the leader of the Karate Kommandos.
 Pepper (voiced by Kathy Garver) - a technology expert and mechanic.
 Reed (voiced by Sam Fontana) - Chuck's young apprentice and Pepper's brother.
 Kimo (voiced by Alan Oppenheimer) - a samurai warrior.
 Tabe (voiced by Robert Ito) - a sumo champion.
 Too Much (voiced by Mona Marshall) - Chuck's young ward.

VULTURE
VULTURE is an evil organization that plots to take over the world. Its members include:
 Claw (voiced by Bill Martin) - the leader of VULTURE who serves as the primary antagonist of the series. Claw has a metal claw for a right arm which he often shows when quoting to his operatives on their assignments to "Remember this".
 Super-Ninja (voiced by Keone Young) - a ninja who is Claw's right-hand man.
 VULTURE Ninjas - the foot soldiers of VULTURE.

Episodes

Home media
In 1987, a VHS tape of Chuck Norris: Karate Kommandos was released by Worldvision Home Video.

The complete series was released on DVD on April 1, 2011, via Warner Archive line.

Comic book
There was also a comic book series published by Star Comics, an imprint of Marvel Comics which produced comic books aimed at young children. Steve Ditko provided the art. The series ran four issues from January through July 1987.

Issue #1 found Too-Much daydreaming in class about being as great a martial artist as Chuck Norris, even taking down the Super Ninja singlehandedly. Without warning, Too-Much's teacher calls on him to give his book report (which he characteristically has not even started) on James Clavell's The Children's Story. Then Too-Much, his classmates, and their teacher are taken hostage by the Klaw's ninjas, who demand the Super-cruiser in return for their release. The Super-cruiser, which looks like a U-Haul truck, is a new anti-terrorist weapon created by Norris for the government. Pepper drives the Super-cruiser to the school, where she and her trusty dog take on the ninjas, while Chuck himself barges into the classroom and knocks out more of the ninjas. One of the ninjas tries to shoot Norris, who stops the bullet with a copy of The Children's Story; he then sells Too-Much a bill of goods about what a great book this is, while the police haul the ninjas off to jail.

Issue #2 has Norris looking into a possible conspiracy to steal the new Banana 7000 prototype by going to a seedy seaside bar and asking too many questions. Kimo, Tabe, Pepper and Reed are guarding the newest prototype at a hotel but the Cult of the Klaw get the drop on Pepper, kidnap her and steal it while Kimo and Tabe are taking a break. Reed is distracted by Margie, a stranger whose mother is ill and is convinced by The Cult of the Klaw to help steal the computer for money for her mother's operation. The Karate Kommandos, now joined by Too Much and Wolf, return to find the hotel empty. They change into their battle suits and begin to search for Pepper. Meanwhile Pepper is being forced to show The Klaw's ninjas how to use the computer. Margie does not want anyone to be hurt so turns on them by making a plan with Pepper to escape. The Kommandos arrive at the enemies bungalow and enter politely according to Kimo. They take out the ninjas inside but as a last ditch effort, their leader attempts to threaten Pepper but when he enters Pepper's room, Margie takes him out with a vase. There was a big reward for anyone who helps apprehend the thieves who were after the computer and Norris believes Margie earned it. She is so grateful to be able pay for her mother’s operation she rewards Reed with a kiss.

Action figures
To coincide with the airing of the show, Kenner Products made a set of action figures based on the main characters of the show. Kenner also made many accessories, including weapons and vehicles, to go along with the figurines.

Popular culture
 The show gets a mention in episode 23 of Space Dandy.
 The show is parodied in the 2012 CGI series version of Teenage Mutant Ninja Turtles via a fictional cartoon show named Chris Bradford's 2 Ruff Krew, starring and produced by Chris Bradford, himself a parody of Chuck Norris. This fictional series is first featured in the 4th-season episode "The Weird World of Wyrm".

Stations

References

External links

 
  Classic TV Clip from College Humor
  Review by Karate Party

1986 American television series debuts
1986 American television series endings
1980s American animated television series
American television series with live action and animation
Television series by Ruby-Spears
Warner Bros. Television Studios franchises
Ruby-Spears superheroes
First-run syndicated television programs in the United States
Martial arts television series
Star Comics titles
Television shows adapted into comics
Comics based on real people
Animation based on real people
Cultural depictions of Chuck Norris
American children's animated action television series